Generation of Evil is a 2022 Lithuanian nordic noir crime thriller film by Emilis Vėlyvis, starring Vytautas Kaniusonis, Ingeborga Dapkunaite, and Saulius Siparis.

Plot
Gintas Krasauskas is a 55-year-old police chief in a small town. He is a model family man with a wife and two children, and he aspires to become the town's mayor. However, he is also sleeping with the wife of his friend Laimonas, the town's prosecutor general.

Laimonas is soon found dead in a suspected suicide. The national prosecutor, Simonas, joins the investigation and discovers that the man's real cause of death was due to prolonged torture: a venomous snake was inserted into his body.

A flashback to the year 1990 reveals that the town's current elite—Gintas, Laimonas, judge Julius, priest Antanas, and the incumbent female mayor, Rasa, were once Soviet KGB informants.

During the course of a few days, the judge and priest join the list of the dead, Gintas is suspected of the murders, and events take an unexpected turn. Gintas visits his mother, who predicts that her son will be next to die. Simonas is revealed to have accidentally witnessed the secret events of 1990, while still a kid. He proceeds to set Rasa on fire and shoots Gintas. Gintas' young son, Ben, shoots Simonas in turn.

Production
Principal photography for The Generation of Evil took place in the Lithuanian city of Plungė in 2020.

Cast and characters

 Vytautas Kaniusonis as police chief Gintas Krasauskas
 James Tratas as young Gintas
 Ingeborga Dapkunaite as mayor Rasa Kymantaite
 Elvyra Zebertaviciute as Gintas' mother
 Donatas Simukauskas as police officer Arunas
  as prosecutor Laimonas Liaudanskas
 Marius Siparis as young Laimonas
 Ainis Storpirstis as national prosecutor Simonas
 Vaidotas Martinaitis as judge Julius
 Toma Vaskeviciute as wife of police chief Gintas
 Sakalas Uzdavinys as Vytautas Venclova
 Marius Repsys as criminal investigator
 Mindaugas Papinigis as the mayor's clerk

Critical reception
In a 2022 review, Darius Voitukevičius of Delfi.lt wrote that The Generation of Evil is "high-caliber, unpredictable, tense, and the most mature film by Vėlyvis, who has proven that not only Scandinavians have the talent to create strong detective cinema".

In a separate article, the publication wrote that the "Scandinavian noir film has made an attempt to show the work of law enforcement officers (...) without sugarcoating and exaggerated heroism".

Milda Govedaitè with 15min wrote, "Director Emilis Vėlyvis has seemingly decided to abandon the adult-only jokes of his earlier films and move on with a mature, solid criminal detective story this time around", adding, "It is possible that we have not seen such a cruel Lithuanian film before".

The Generation of Evil won the  Audience Award in 2022.

References

External links
 

2022 crime films
2022 crime thriller films
Lithuanian thriller films
Lithuanian-language films
Films set in Lithuania
Films shot in Lithuania
Cinema_of_Lithuania